Mickaël Ivaldi (born 20 February 1990, in La Seyne-sur-Mer)  is a French Rugby Union player. His position is Hooker and he currently plays for Montpellier.

References

External links
Mickaël Ivaldi on itsrugby.co.uk.
Mickaël Ivaldi on espnscrum.com.

Montpellier Hérault Rugby players
French rugby union players
1990 births
Living people
People from La Seyne-sur-Mer
Sportspeople from Var (department)
Lyon OU players